Polar Wrocław is a Polish sports club based in the Zakrzów district of Wrocław, Poland, named after the local electronics company "Polar". The women's field hockey team exists since 1967. The men's football team is currently competing in the amateur divisions. The club used to be called "ZKS Polar" (Zakładowy Klub Sportowy Polar Wrocław) but after being in the centre of a huge corruption scandal in 2004 the club was dissolved. On 11 March 2005 the club "MKS Polar Wrocław-Zawidawie" was founded which continues the clubs traditions.

Current squad
As of 8 April 2015

Honours 
Quarter Final Polish Cup – 2002/03.
9th place in Second Division - 1999/2000, 2001/02

See also 

 Football in Poland
 List of football teams

External links
Official website (in Polish)

 
Football clubs in Wrocław
Association football clubs established in 1945
1945 establishments in Poland
Polish field hockey clubs